Visperud is a neighborhood in Lørenskog, Norway, right on the border to Oslo. North of the area, at Robsrud, lays the main facilities for Norway Post and The Coca-Cola Company in Norway. The area is proposed as a future stop should the Furuset Line of the Oslo Metro be extended.

References

Villages in Akershus
Lørenskog